The Heavenly and Earthly Trinites (also known as The Two Trinities or The Pedroso Holy Family) is an oil painting on canvas of  by the Spanish artist Bartolomé Esteban Murillo in the National Gallery, London. It depicts a young Jesus with the Virgin Mary and Saint Joseph (the three of whom make up the Holy Family, the earthly trinity of the painting's title), together with God the Father and the Holy Spirit (who with Christ as God the Son form the Holy Trinity). The subject, inspired by the Finding in the Temple, is rare, though it does appear elsewhere in Spanish and Flemish art.

Provenance
The work first appears in the written record in a mention by Antonio Palomino, Murillo's main biographer, who saw it in Cadiz in 1708 in the art collection of Carlos Francisco Colarte, . It was still in the Pedroso family collection early in the 19th century and was acquired in Seville by James Campbell for the British art dealer William Buchanan; it arrived in Britain in January 1810. It was then acquired by Thomas Bulkeley Bulkeley-Owen, before being bought by its present owner with Peter Paul Rubens's Brazen Serpent in 1837.

References

Paintings by Bartolomé Esteban Murillo
Paintings of the Holy Family
1680s paintings
Collections of the National Gallery, London
Paintings depicting the Holy Trinity